Total Fucking Necro is a compilation album comprising two complete Anaal Nathrakh demos, Anaal Nathrakh and Total Fucking Necro, and one previously unreleased track from the unreleased We Will Fucking Kill You demo (2001). This album was originally released on Leviaphonic Records in 2000 with only 8 tracks and a different track order. A re-issue of the album was released on June 11, 2021. The re-issue includes a limited edition run of special vinyls, along with a jewel case CD.

Reception

Pedro Avezedo from Chronicles of Chaos gave the album 8/10 in his review. He praised the aggressive nature of the album, also stating that the album was more destructive than Ulver's Bergatt – Et eeventyr i 5 capitler. However, Avezedo criticized the production of the album.

Track listing

Personnel
 V.I.T.R.I.O.L. – vocals
 Leicia – bass
 Irrumator – all other instruments

References

Anaal Nathrakh albums
2002 compilation albums